Tilbury Town railway station is on a loop line of the London, Tilbury and Southend line, serving the town of Tilbury, Essex. Its three-letter station code is TIL.

The station was opened on 15 June 1885 with the name Tilbury Dock by the London, Tilbury and Southend Railway. It was renamed Tilbury Town on 3 August 1934.

Today, the station and all trains serving it are operated by c2c.

Services 

The typical off-peak service consists of:
2 trains per hour (tph) to London Fenchurch Street via ;
2 tph to Southend Central.

In popular culture 
The station plays two roles in the 2009 film Fish Tank – it appears in the film, and the star, Katie Jarvis, was recruited after a scout saw her arguing with her boyfriend at Tilbury Town station.

The station and its environs in the Victorian era are also mentioned briefly in Robert Roberts' 1895 book Diary of a Voyage to Australia, New Zealand, and Other Lands, written a mere 10 years after the station opened.

References

External links 

Transport in Thurrock
Railway stations in Essex
DfT Category D stations
Former London, Tilbury and Southend Railway stations
Railway stations in Great Britain opened in 1885
Railway stations served by c2c
Railway stations serving harbours and ports in the United Kingdom
Tilbury